The Absentee is a 1951 Mexican drama film directed by Julio Bracho. It was entered into the 1952 Cannes Film Festival.

Plot
Jorge de la Cueva (Arturo de Córdova) is in great pain after his wife's death in a car accident. Hoping to discover what really happened, he decides to investigate the circumstances of the accident.

Cast
 Arturo de Córdova - Jorge de la Cueva
 Rosita Quintana - Monica Sandoval
 Andrea Palma - Cecilia
 María Douglas - Magdalena
 Ramón Gay - Jaime
 Mimí Derba - Doña Elena, mother of isabel
 Natalia Ortiz - Maria, maid
 Carlos Riquelme - mechanic
 Manuel Sánchez Navarro - Rafael, butler
 Enrique Díaz 'Indiano' - father of Isabel
 Angélica María - Rosita
 Felipe Montoya - Dr Beltrán

References

External links

1951 films
1950s Spanish-language films
1951 drama films
Mexican black-and-white films
Films directed by Julio Bracho
Mexican drama films
1950s Mexican films